Susan Collins (born 1952) is a  U.S. Senator from Maine since 1997. Senator Collins may also refer to:

Annazette Collins (born 1962), Illinois State Senate
Dennis J. Collins (1900-1974), Illinois State Senate
Donald Collins (Maine politician) (1925–2018), Maine State Senate
Donald Collins (Vermont politician) (born 1942), Vermont State Senate
Earlean Collins (fl. 1990s–2010s), Illinois State Senate
Francis Dolan Collins (1841–1891), Pennsylvania State Senate
Jacqueline Y. Collins (born 1949), Illinois State Senate
John F. Collins (1919–1995), Massachusetts State Senate
Josiah Collins (North Carolina politician) (1807–1863), North Carolina State Senate
LeRoy Collins (1909–1991), Florida State Senate
Lorenzo D. Collins (1821–1898), New York State Senate
Mac Collins (1944–2018), Georgia State Senate
Michael F. Collins (1854–1928), New York State Senate
Nancy Adams Collins (born 1947), Mississippi State Senate
Oakley C. Collins (1916–1994), Ohio State Senate
Patrick Collins (mayor) (1844–1905), Massachusetts State Senate
Ronald F. Collins (fl. 2010s), Maine State Senate
Samuel Collins (politician) (1923–2012), Maine State Senate
Thomas Collins (governor) (1732–1789), Delaware State Senate
Vinson Allen Collins (1867–1966), Texas State Senate
William O. Collins (1809–1880), Ohio State Senate